= HD 128093 =

Star in the constellation Boötes

Observation data Epoch J2000 Equinox ICRS
- Constellation: Boötes
- Right ascension: 14^{h} 34^{m} 11.70699^{s}
- Declination: +32° 32′ 04.1236″
- Apparent magnitude (V): 6.33

Characteristics
- Evolutionary stage: main sequence
- Spectral type: F5V
- U−B color index: −0.01
- B−V color index: +0.40

Astrometry
Radial velocity (R_{v})	−8.1 km/s
Proper motion (μ)	RA: +105.977 mas/yr Dec.: +6.572 mas/yr
Parallax (π)	24.1788±0.0190 mas
Distance	134.9 ± 0.1 ly (41.36 ± 0.03 pc)
Absolute magnitude (M_{V})	3.29

Details
Mass	1.3 M_{☉}
Radius	1.7 R_{☉}
Luminosity	4.2 L_{☉}
Surface gravity (log g)	4.08 cgs
Temperature	6,439 K
Metallicity [Fe/H]	−0.27±0.03 dex
Rotational velocity (v sin i)	15 km/s
Age	2.6 Gyr

Other designations
- BD+33°2474, FK5 3153, HD 127304, HIP 71243, HR 5445, SAO 64221

Database references
SIMBAD	data

HD 128093 is an F-type main-sequence star in the constellation Boötes, 135 light years away. It has an apparent magnitude of 6.33, and a spectral class of F5V.

HD 128093 has a magnitude 11.33 companion at an angular separation of 28.1 along a position angle of 318°. With a parallax of 2.6 mas, it is about 10 times further away than HD 128093.
